Quincy Spencer Davis III (born 16 February 1983) is an American-born Taiwanese professional basketball player who plays for the New Taipei Kings of the P. League+. He renounced his U.S. citizenship in June 2013 to naturalize in Taiwan so that he could play for the Chinese Taipei national team in international competition.

Childhood and education
Davis was born in Los Angeles, California in an African American family. He graduated from McGill–Toolen Catholic High School in Mobile, Alabama in 2002 before going on to Tulane University, where he played for Tulane Green Wave men's basketball. As a freshman, in a game against the University of Southern Mississippi he matched the school record for single-game field goal percentage. In his four-year career there until 2006, he scored a total of 1,106 points, including 56 games with more than 10 points and 12 with more than 20. He collected 559 rebounds, including 226 offensive rebounds, making him one of just fourteen players in school history to achieve both a thousand points and five hundred rebounds. He also set the school record with a .577 career field goal percentage.

Early career
Davis first went overseas to play for ETHA Engomis in Cyprus in 2006. The next season, he played in Portugal. There, he appeared in eight games, averaging 5.5 points per game. The following year, he moved to mainland China to play in the National Basketball League. After his next season in Turkey, he came to Taiwan to join Pure-Youth Construction in the Super Basketball League. In March 2012, he won SBL's Player of the Month award for leading his team to a 6–1 record that month with an average of 20.1 points, 14 rebounds, 1.9 blocks, two assists, and 1.4 steals per game.

Davis also became a partner in Coast To Coast Basketball, a basketball instruction institute founded in 2007 by fellow expatriate player Edward Hardy II.

Naturalization in Taiwan
The suggestion that Davis join the Chinese Taipei national team was first floated in January 2013 at the SBL 2012 MVP award ceremony. At the time, Davis stated that he was open to the idea of naturalizing as a Republic of China citizen so he could represent Taiwan in international competition. He said that of all the places in which he had played basketball, he felt happiest in Taiwan. However, naturalization would require him to renounce his U.S. citizenship, as Taiwan allows multiple citizenship only for its own citizens who have emigrated, and not for immigrants applying to become new citizens. Furthermore, as Davis did not meet the ordinary residence requirements for naturalization and his case would thus be processed by special dispensation, Taiwan sports officials also had to lobby for the support of the Ministry of the Interior. Contract length and salary negotiations introduced further delays, until in May 2013 it was announced that Davis had agreed to a US$20,000/month, two-year contract and had officially applied for naturalization.

On 25 June 2013, Davis went to the American Institute in Taiwan, the de facto U.S. embassy, to renounce his citizenship. The AIT processed his case much more quickly than would have been done under normal procedures, and he received his Certificate of Loss of Nationality three days later, temporarily making him a stateless person. There remained doubts whether the Ministry of the Interior could complete all the procedures relating to his naturalization by the 12 July deadline for him to register for the 2013 FIBA Asia Championship, but in the end he was officially naturalized as a citizen of the Republic of China on 9 July. Taiwanese American players such as Richard Chang had previously joined the Chinese Taipei team, but Davis was the first American of another ethnic background to follow in their footsteps.

Later career
Davis played with the Chinese Taipei team in an exhibition game against visiting National Basketball Association players from his former country on 29 June, scoring 25 points. He then represented the Chinese Taipei team in the 2013 William Jones Cup and in the FIBA Championship 2013, where he scored an average of 14.7 points per game. Davis led the team to second place in the 2014 FIBA Asia Cup, scoring 19 points and grabbing 12 rebounds in the final game against Iran. Davis was barred from participating in the 2014 Asian Games because he had not fulfilled the residency requirements to represent Taiwan as a naturalized citizen.

In 2022, P. League+ announced it would reconsider its policies towards naturalized players; it was rumored that Davis would have his status in the league changed to "foreign player" from local, which he found shocking and later stated made him consider retirement. After a meeting was held by the board of directors, the league announced that he would continue to be treated as a local player for the 2023 season.

Personal life
Davis is married to a Taiwanese national. He is a vegan, and opened Uncle Q, a vegan restaurant in Taipei at the end of 2019. The restaurant primarily serves American style food.

See also
List of former United States citizens who relinquished their nationality

References

External links
 Quincy Davis FIBA.com profile 
 Quincy Davis Pure-Youth Construction Basketball Team official website profile 

1983 births
Living people
American emigrants to Taiwan
American expatriate basketball people in China
American expatriate basketball people in Cyprus
American expatriate basketball people in Portugal
American expatriate basketball people in Turkey
American expatriate basketball people in Venezuela
American men's basketball players
Basketball players from Los Angeles
Bornova Belediye players
Centers (basketball)
Jiangsu Dragons players
Naturalised citizens of Taiwan
Power forwards (basketball)
Taiwanese men's basketball players
Taiwanese people of African-American descent
Tulane Green Wave men's basketball players
Taiwanese restaurateurs

New Taipei Kings players
Taoyuan Pilots players
Pauian Archiland basketball players
Chinese Taipei men's national basketball team players
Super Basketball League imports